Ján Emil Kalous (born 1902, date of death unknown) was a Czech long-distance runner. He competed in the marathon at the 1924 Summer Olympics.

References

External links
 

1902 births
Year of death missing
Athletes (track and field) at the 1924 Summer Olympics
Czech male long-distance runners
Czech male marathon runners
Olympic athletes of Czechoslovakia